Discovery Seamounts are a chain of seamounts in the Southern Atlantic Ocean, which include the Discovery Seamount. Various volcanic rocks as well as glacial dropstones and sediments have been dredged from the seamounts.

The Discovery Seamounts appear to be a volcanic seamount chain controlled by the Discovery hotspot, which had its starting point either in the ocean, Cretaceous kimberlite fields in southern Namibia or the Karoo-Ferrar large igneous province. The seamounts formed between 41 and 35 million years ago; presently the hotspot is thought to lie southwest of the seamounts, where there are geological anomalies in the Mid-Atlantic Ridge that may reflect the presence of a neighbouring hotspot.

Name and discovery 

Discovery Seamount was discovered in 1936 by the research ship RRS Discovery II and was originally named Discovery Bank by the crew of a German research ship, RV Schwabenland. The seamount received another name, Discovery Tablemount, in 1963. In 1993 the name "Discovery Bank" was transferred by the General Bathymetric Chart of the Oceans to another seamount at Kerguelen, leaving the name "Discovery Seamounts" for the seamounts.

Geography and geomorphology 

These seamounts are also referred to as the Discovery Rise and subdivided into a northwestern and a southeastern trend. 

The largest of these seamounts is named Discovery Seamount, which given its shape might once have been an island. The seamount is covered with fossil-containing sediments, which have been used to infer paleoclimate conditions in the region during the Pleistocene. Some of the sediment appears to be ice-rafted debris, and other evidence has been used to postulate that the seamount subsided by about  during the late Pleistocene. Another member of the Discovery Seamounts has been christened Shannon Seamount.

The crust underneath Discovery Seamount is about 67 million years old, thus of late Cretaceous age. A fracture zone, thus a site of crustal weakness, is located nearby.

Geology 

The Southern Atlantic Ocean contains a number of volcanic systems such as the Discovery Seamounts, the Rio Grande Rise, the Shona Ridge and the Walvis Ridge which are commonly attributed to hotspots, although this interpretation has been challenged. The hotspot origin of Discovery and the Walvis-Tristan da Cunha seamount chains was first proposed in 1972. In the case of the Shona Ridge and the Discovery Seamounts, the theory postulates that they formed as the African Plate moved over the Shona hotspot and the Discovery hotspot.

It is not clear if a Discovery Hotspot exists, nor whether it is linked in any way to Gough Island or to the Tristan hotspot. The formation of the Discovery Seamounts may instead have been caused by ascent of magma along a fracture zone or other crustal weakness. If the hotspot does exist, it would have to be located southwest of the Discovery Seamounts where low seismic velocity anomalies have been detected in the mantle. The Discovery Seamounts almost wane out in that direction although it has been proposed that the Little Ridge close to the Mid-Atlantic Ridge may be their continuation. The Discovery Ridge close to the Mid-Atlantic Ridge may be the product of the hotspot as well; magma flowing from the Discovery hotspot to the Mid-Atlantic Ridge may be leading to excessive production of crustal material there.

Petrological anomalies at spreading ridges have been often attributed to the presence of mantle plumes close to the ridge and such has been proposed for the Discovery hotspot as well. There is a region on the Mid-Atlantic Ridge southwest of the seamounts where there are fewer earthquakes than elsewhere along the ridge, the central valley of the ridge is absent and where dredged rocks share geochemical traits with the Discovery Seamount; that may be the location of the Discovery Hotspot. A position about halfway between the Mid-Atlantic Ridge and the Discovery Seamounts has been inferred. The Discovery hotspot may be connected to the Tristan hotspot deep in the mantle.

The South Atlantic features one of the largest transform faults of Earth, the Agulhas-Falkland fracture zone. This unusual structure may be due to magma from the Discovery hotspot, which would have been channelled to the Agulhas Ridge.

Composition 

Rocks dredged from the seamounts include lavas, pillow lavas and volcaniclastic rocks. Geochemically they are classified as alkali basalt, basalt, phonolite, tephriphonolite trachyandesite, trachybasalt and trachyte. Minerals contained in the rocks include alkali feldspar, apatite, biotite, clinopyroxene, iron and titanium oxides, olivine, plagioclase, sphene and spinel. Continental crust rocks dredged at the seamounts may be glacial dropstones, manganese have also been found.

The Discovery hotspot appears to have erupted two separate sets of magmas with distinct compositions, similar to the Tristan da Cunha-Gough Island hotspot. The composition of the Discovery Seamounts rocks has been compared to Gough Island. The more felsic rocks at Discovery appear to be derived from magma chamber processes, similar to felsic rocks at other Atlantic Ocean islands.

Biology 

Soviet fishery during the 1970s and 1980s and others have found  150 fish species at Discovery Seamount. Both Japanese and Soviet trawled the seamounts during that time, but there was no commercial exploitation of the resources. Among animals are bamboo corals and sea urchins, Conophora verrucosa, a stylasteride hydrozoan while fish species there include the pygmy flounder; the deep-sea hatchetfish Maurolicus inventionis and the codling Guttigadus nudirostre are endemic to Discovery Seamount. Fossil corals have been recovered in dredges. Observations in 2019 detected changes in the Discovery Seamount ecosystems that may be due to fishing or sea urchin outbreaks.

Eruption history 

A number of dates ranging from 41 to 35 million years ago have been obtained on dredged samples from the seamounts on the basis of argon-argon dating, but at Discovery Seamount it may have continued until 7-6.5 million years ago. The age of the seamounts decreases in southwest direction, similar to the Walvis Ridge, and at a similar rate. It is possible that Discovery Seamount was split into a northern and southern part about 20 million years ago.

Unlike the Walvis Ridge, which is connected to the Etendeka flood basalts, the Discovery Seamounts do not link with onshore volcanic features. However, it has been proposed that the 70-80 million years old Blue Hills, Gibeon and Gross Brukkaros kimberlite fields in southern Namibia may have been formed by the Discovery hotspot, and some plate reconstructions place it underneath the Karoo-Ferrar large igneous province at the time at which it was emplaced. Between 60 and 40 million years ago it was located close to the spreading ridge of the South Atlantic.

References

Sources 

 
 
 
 
 
 
 
 
 
 
 
 

Seamounts of the Atlantic Ocean
Oceanography
Submarine volcanoes